Saint Sarkis Church of New Julfa, (Armenian: ,), is an Armenian Apostolic church in New Julfa, Iran. It is located in Yerevan neighbourhood of New Julfa.

History 

Saint Sarkis Church was built in 1659. It was originally named All Saviours Church. After devotion of relic of St. Nerses to this church in 1850s from the older St. Sarkis of New Julfa, it was renamed to St. Sarkis Church. 
There is a chapel Named St. Sthen built 1704. Also there are several tombstones in the courtyard, including one belonging to Gregory, a martyr.

See also
Iranian Armenians
List of Armenian churches in Iran

References 

Architecture in Iran
Churches in Isfahan
Armenian Apostolic churches in Iran
Oriental Orthodox congregations established in the 17th century
Tourist attractions in Isfahan